Chap Chap (also Romanized as Chepchep and Chop Chop) is a village in Zanjanrud-e Pain Rural District, Zanjanrud District, Zanjan County, Zanjan Province, Iran. At the 2006 census, its population was 677, in 143 families.

References 

Populated places in Zanjan County